An AquaLoop is a type of body water slide where single riders are dropped down a near vertical slide and into an inclined loop. They are usually located in water parks.

History
Austrian manufacturer Aquarena developed the world's first mass-produced fully inverted looping water slide, known as the AquaLoop. The slide is currently licensed and distributed by Canadian water slide manufacturer WhiteWater West. There are nearly 20 AquaLoop installations around the world. The first installation was at Terme 3000 water park, Slovenia in 2008. Wet'n'Wild Gold Coast was the first to install more than one AquaLoop at a single location. Riders experience 2.5 Gs in less than 2 seconds. The whole ride is over within 7 seconds.

Ride
An AquaLoop is launched from a  platform. A single rider is loaded into a launch chamber where they stand with their hands across their chest. After a countdown, a trapdoor opens and the rider immediately drops  inside a near vertical slide. This element is a variation of the traditional vertical loop because it lies on an angle of approximately 45°. This variation of a loop is called an inclined loop. The  slide is over within 7 seconds.

Installations

Similar water slides
The first known existence of a looping water slide was at Action Park in Vernon, USA, in the mid-1980s. Their water slide featured a vertical loop but was repeatedly closed due to safety concerns.

More recently, ProSlide developed the SuperLOOP which features a fast, downward spiralling helix after a trapdoor release. The first installation was The Wedgie at nearby WhiteWater World. It was marketed as a looping water slide despite riders never actually experiencing an inversion.

References

External links
 

Water rides manufactured by WhiteWater West